In mathematics, for positive integers k and s, a vectorial addition chain is a sequence V of k-dimensional vectors of nonnegative integers vi for −k + 1 ≤ i ≤ s together with a sequence w,
such that

                     ⋮
                     ⋮

   vi =vj+vr for all 1≤i≤s with -k+1≤j, r≤i-1
   vs = [n0,...,nk-1]
   w = (w1,...ws), wi=(j,r).

For example, a vectorial addition chain for [22,18,3] is 
V=([1,0,0],[0,1,0],[0,0,1],[1,1,0],[2,2,0],[4,4,0],[5,4,0],[10,8,0],[11,9,0],[11,9,1],[22,18,2],[22,18,3])
w=((-2,-1),(1,1),(2,2),(-2,3),(4,4),(1,5),(0,6),(7,7),(0,8))

Vectorial addition chains are well suited to perform multi-exponentiation:

Input: Elements x0,...,xk-1 of an abelian group G and a vectorial addition chain of dimension k computing [n0,...,nk-1] 
Output:The element x0n0...xk-1nr-1
 for i =-k+1 to 0 do yi → xi+k-1
 for i = 1 to s do yi  →yj×yr 
return ys

Addition sequence
An addition sequence for the set of integer S ={n0, ..., nr-1} is an addition chain v that contains every element of S.

For example, an addition sequence computing 
{47,117,343,499} 
is
(1,2,4,8,10,11,18,36,47,55,91,109,117,226,343,434,489,499).

It's possible to find addition sequence from vectorial addition chains and vice versa, so they are in a sense dual.

See also
Addition chain
Addition-chain exponentiation
Exponentiation by squaring
Non-adjacent form

References

Addition chains